Rockfish is a census-designated place (CDP) in Hoke County, North Carolina, United States. The population was 3,298 at the 2010 census, up from 2,353 at the 2000 census.

History
Puppy Creek Plantation was listed on the National Register of Historic Places in 1976.

Geography
Rockfish is located in eastern Hoke County at  (34.991167, -79.066654). It is bordered to the east across Stewarts Creek by the city of Fayetteville in Cumberland County.

The community is drained by Stewart Creek and Gully Branch, both of which flow south to Rockfish Creek, an east-flowing tributary of the Cape Fear River.

Demographics

2020 census

As of the 2020 United States census, there were 3,383 people, 1,348 households, and 948 families residing in the CDP.

2000 census
As of the census of 2000, there were 2,353 people, 805 households, and 680 families residing in the CDP. The population density was 469.9 people per square mile (181.3/km). There were 893 housing units at an average density of 178.3/sq mi (68.8/km). The racial makeup of the CDP was 76.50% White, 14.32% African American, 2.76% Native American, 1.10% Asian, 0.30% Pacific Islander, 1.70% from other races, and 3.31% from two or more races. Hispanic or Latino of any race were 7.39% of the population.

There were 805 households, out of which 51.8% had children under the age of 18 living with them, 74.2% were married couples living together, 6.6% had a female householder with no husband present, and 15.5% were non-families. 11.4% of all households were made up of individuals, and 1.9% had someone living alone who was 65 years of age or older. The average household size was 2.92 and the average family size was 3.15.

In the CDP, the population was spread out, with 33.0% under the age of 18, 7.5% from 18 to 24, 45.8% from 25 to 44, 10.0% from 45 to 64, and 3.7% who were 65 years of age or older. The median age was 29 years. For every 100 females, there were 102.0 males. For every 100 females age 18 and over, there were 101.9 males.

The median income for a household in the CDP was $46,786, and the median income for a family was $54,375. Males had a median income of $35,574 versus $22,102 for females. The per capita income for the CDP was $18,112. About 6.6% of families and 7.1% of the population were below the poverty line, including 6.0% of those under age 18 and 8.7% of those age 65 or over.

References

Census-designated places in Hoke County, North Carolina
Census-designated places in North Carolina
Fayetteville, North Carolina metropolitan area